Uplifting trance (often synonymous with epic trance, energetic trance, anthem trance, emotional trance, or euphoric trance) is a broad subgenre of trance music. The name, which emerged in the wake of progressive trance in 1996, is derived from the feeling which listeners claim to get (often described as a "rush"). The genre, which originated in Germany, is massively popular in the trance scene, and is one of the dominant forms of dance music worldwide. Historically it is related to the emergence of psychedelic trance and the two styles influenced each other. Classical music strongly influenced the development of uplifting trance both in the 1990s and in the 2000s, with film music also considered influential.

Characteristics

In general, uplifting trance is a style much happier in tone than other trance genres (such as Goa). Instead of the darker tone of Goa, uplifting trance uses similar chord progressions as progressive trance, but tracks' chord progressions usually rest on a major chord, and the balance between major and minor chords in a progression will determine how "happy" or "sad" the progression sounds.

The genre features longer major chord progressions in all elements (lead synth, bass, and treble). It also contains extended breakdowns and relegation of arpeggiation (the melodic part of the song, usually consisting of "Saw Synths/Square Lead" type sounds) to the background while bringing wash effects to the fore (the harmonic element of the music, or "background fill", usually consisting of synth choir/voice/string chord progressions).

As a rule of thumb, trance beats in the range of 128–140 BPM. Uplifting trance very commonly employs side-chain compression, a modern production technique. It is commonly referred to as "ducking the kick", where the background strings/synths have their volume automated, creating a pulsing effect on the off-beat.

Etymology

The term has been used to describe what most other people call "epic trance" in the UK's trance scene, to describe some non UK-based commercial trance acts, like Brooklyn Bounce or Darude, which has created some confusion in terminology and classification. Many UK fans call those acts "uplifting house". The term is also used on the psychedelic trance/Goa trance scene, although these styles are not really meant to sound uplifting (there is the possibility some people may be thinking of the term "uplifting" in this case to mean "euphoric").

Current status

Beginning in the latter part of the 2000s, uplifting trance saw an eruption in interest amongst new and old fans and re-established itself within the trance scene, played by such leading trance artists as 4 Strings, ATB, Ferry Corsten, Armin van Buuren, Dash Berlin, RAM, Tiësto and Above & Beyond. (A decade earlier Paul Oakenfold, Sasha & Digweed, and Paul van Dyk had sparked interest.) Today, uplifting has emerged as a widely popular electronic dance music subgenre with DJs and producers such as John O'Callaghan, Daniel Kandi, Bryan Kearney, Andy Blueman, Aly & Fila, Sean Tyas and Super8 & Tab focusing particularly on uplifting trance as their overriding genre, and others, such as Jason van Wyk, Above & Beyond, who include uplifting trance as part of their broader repertoire. In addition, online radio stations such as Paris One and Afterhours.FM are significantly devoted to uplifting trance. In September 2009, Afterhours.FM hosted "Uplift Day" that was exclusively dedicated to uplifting trance.

In recent years, a subgenre of uplifting trance—dubbed "orchestral uplifting" or "uplifting trance with symphonic orchestra" and pioneered by Andy Blueman, Ciro Visone, SoundLift, Arctic Moon, Ralph Barendse, Simon O'Shine, Ahmed Romel and others—has developed, wherein the timbres and instruments used in the track are those used in symphonic orchestras, including flutes, non-lyrical choral voices, violins, pianos, horns, orchestral drums, and others, and often includes even-longer-than-usual emotional orchestral breakdowns, while still preserving the other aspects of uplifting trance, therefore differing from the subgenre that was called "orchestral trance" a decade earlier. This new style has noticeably influenced the work of many artists outside the uplifting scene, including the Black Pearl project of Ralph Fritsch and Roger Shah, who ordinarily identifies with Balearic trance rather than uplifting.

References

Trance genres